Yves Chaland (3 April 1957 – 18 July 1990) was a French cartoonist.

During the 1980s, together with Luc Cornillon, Serge Clerc and Floc'h, he launched the Atomic style, a stylish remake of the Marcinelle School in Franco-Belgian comics.

Biography

Chaland published his first strips in the fanzine Biblipop when he was 17. During his studies at the Ecole des Beaux-Arts, Saint-Etienne, he created his own fanzine, L'Unité de Valeur, in 1976, with Luc Cornillon.

In 1978, he met writer/editor Jean-Pierre Dionnet, and they collaborated on features published in the Franco-Belgian comics magazines Métal Hurlant and Ah Nana. These pastiches of 50s comics have been collected in the album Captivant.

He then created the characters of Bob Fish, Adolphus Claar, Freddy Lombard, and Le Jeune Albert, a scamp character living in the Marolles, a working-class area of Brussels. Yves Chaland, was approached to draw an adventure of Spirou et Fantasio, appearinging in half-page installments of the weekly Spirou magazine.  Done in a retro 50s style similar to his influences Jijé and André Franquin, both former artists on the Spirou feature. The unfinished story has been collected in the album  Spirou et Fantasio – Hors Série, No. 4 (Dupuis, 2003).

He also did many advertising illustration commissions in his crisp, clean, "retro-modern" cartoon style.

Books published in English
As with many Franco-Belgian comics, Chaland's works have had limited publication in English. The complete Freddy Lombard series was released in the two volume Chaland Anthology. These were the only two released in English (in both paper and hardback, in 2003), while 4 volumes were released in French, containing his complete comic strip works for Métal Hurlant. (Chaland – L'Intégrale).

A Magazine contribute to the knowledge of Chaland's artwork, The Journal of Freddy's friends is also available in English.
 Le Journal des Amis de Freddy #1, editing by Club des Amis de Freddy in 2008, #2 in 2010, #3 in 2012.

Partial bibliography

 Captivant  1st ed. 1979
 Bob Fish  1st ed. 1981
 Adolphus Claar 1st ed. 1982
 John Bravo pre-publication in Astrapi in 1983
 The Adventures of Freddy Lombard
 The Will of Godfrey of Bouillon (Le Testament de Godefroid de Bouillon) 1st ed. 1981
 The Elephant Graveyard (Le Cimetière des éléphants)1st ed. 1984
 The Comet of Carthage (La Comète de Carthage) 1st ed. 1986
 Holiday in Budapest (Vacances à Budapest) 1st ed. 1988
 F-52 1st ed. 1990
 Le Jeune Albert 1st ed. 1985

Awards
 1982 : Best Comic at the Prix Saint-Michel, Belgium
 1984 : Betty Boop of the best comics of the year for  The Elephant Graveyard in  Hyères

References

 Yves Chaland publications in Metal Hurlant and Spirou BDoubliées 
 Yves Chaland albums Bedetheque 

Footnotes

External links
 Yves Chaland biography on Lambiek Comiclopedia
 Yves Chaland homage site by "Atoomstijl"
 The place for the Club Les Amis de Freddy by Club des ADF

1957 births
1990 deaths
French comics artists
French comics writers
French male writers
Artists from Lyon
Road incident deaths in France
20th-century French male writers